Alan Anthony Wiggins Jr. (born July 19, 1985) is an American professional basketball player for KB Ponte Prizreni of the Kosovo Basketball Superleague. He played college basketball for the San Francisco Dons.

High school and college career
Wiggins attended Horizon Christian High School in San Diego, California. He won a state championship during his senior season and averaged 19.7 points, 11.3 rebounds and 4 blocks per game.

Wiggins played college basketball for the San Francisco Dons from 2003 to 2007. He became a starter during his sophomore season and led the team in blocks. Wiggins increased his scoring output during his junior season while he led the West Coast Conference (WCC) in blocks with 2.1 per game. He was named to the first-team All-WCC and won the Father William Dunne Award as the team's most valuable player in his senior season.

Professional career
Wiggins began his career with the semiprofessional Tri Valley Titans of the International Basketball League (IBL). He was selected as the final pick of the 2007 Continental Basketball Association (CBA) draft by the Yakima SunKings but opted to start his professional career with Cholet Basket of the French LNB Pro A. Wiggins won the LNB Pro A Leaders Cup with Cholet during the 2007–08 season.

Wiggins played for BC Dnipro-Azot of the Ukrainian Basketball SuperLeague during the 2012–13 season and led the team in points and rebounds. On August 9, 2013, he signed with the Chiba Jets Funabashi of the Japanese B.League.

On October 12, 2017, Wiggins signed with the Adelaide 36ers of the Australian National Basketball League (NBL). He broke his arm during his debut game and was replaced by Josh Childress.

On August 8, 2018, Wiggins signed with Soproni KC of the Nemzeti Bajnokság I/A.

In October 2021, Wiggins signed with HKK Posušje who play in the Bosnian First Division

Personal life
Wiggins is the son of professional baseball player Alan Wiggins and the brother of Women's National Basketball Association player Candice Wiggins. Another sister, Cassandra, played college basketball for the NYU Violets.

References

External links
College statistics
San Francisco Dons bio

1985 births
Living people
Adelaide 36ers players
African-American basketball players
American expatriate basketball people in Australia
American expatriate basketball people in Belgium
American expatriate basketball people in China
American expatriate basketball people in France
American expatriate basketball people in Hungary
American expatriate basketball people in Japan
American expatriate basketball people in Latvia
American expatriate basketball people in Lithuania
American expatriate basketball people in Romania
American expatriate basketball people in South Korea
American expatriate basketball people in Turkey
American expatriate basketball people in Ukraine
American men's basketball players
Antwerp Giants players
Anyang KGC players
Basketball players from San Diego
BC Dnipro-Azot players
BC Dzūkija players
Best Balıkesir B.K. players
BK Ventspils players
Chiba Jets Funabashi players
Cholet Basket players
Power forwards (basketball)
San Francisco Dons men's basketball players
Small forwards
Soproni KC players
STB Le Havre players
21st-century African-American sportspeople
20th-century African-American people